Fred or Frederick Newman may refer to:

 Fred Newman (actor) (born 1952), American actor
 Fred Newman (baseball) (1942–1987), American baseball player
 Fred Newman (businessman) (1916–2012), British shipbroking and aviation entrepreneur 
 Fred Newman (philosopher) (1935–2011), American philosopher and psychotherapist
 Frederick Newman (English cricketer) (1896–1966), English cricketer
 Frederick Newman (Australian cricketer) (1909–1977), Australian cricketer
 Frederick S. Newman (1847-1906), American architect